Rob Denton (November 20, 1907 – August 12, 1997) was an American soccer goalkeeper who was a member of the United States soccer team at the 1936 Summer Olympics.  He also played six seasons in the American Soccer League and later served as a referee.

Denton signed with the Philadelphia German-Americans in 1935, later moving to Philadelphia Passon.  He left the ASL in 1939.  In 1935, Denton and his teammates won the league title.  A year later, they won the 1936 National Challenge Cup.  He was selected for the 1936 U.S. Olympic soccer team, but did not play in the lone U.S. game of the tournament.  He later served as a referee in the Philadelphia leagues.

References

1907 births
1997 deaths
American soccer players
American soccer referees
Sportspeople from Philadelphia
Soccer players from Philadelphia
Olympic soccer players of the United States
Footballers at the 1936 Summer Olympics
American Soccer League (1933–1983) players
Uhrik Truckers players
Philadelphia Nationals players
Association football goalkeepers